WCUE (1150 AM) is a non-commercial radio station licensed to serve Cuyahoga Falls, Ohio, carrying a Christian format as a repeater for the Family Radio network. Owned by Family Stations, Inc., the station services the Akron metro area. WCUE does not originate any local programming. Both WCUE's studios and station transmitter are located in Cuyahoga Falls.

WCUE airs several Christian ministry broadcasts from noted teachers such as RC Sproul, Alistair Begg, Ken Ham, John F. MacArthur, Adriel Sanchez, Dennis Rainey, John Piper, & others as well as traditional and modern hymns & songs by Keith & Kristyn Getty, The Master's Chorale, Fernando Ortega, Chris Rice, Shane & Shane, Sovereign Grace Music, Sara Groves, & multiple other Christian and Gospel music artists.

History

WCUE began in 1949 as a daytime-only station licensed to Akron, Ohio; the station callsign referred to a musical cue. In 1963, the station's city of license was assigned to Cuyahoga Falls. In the 1970s, WCUE aired a Top 40 format. In 1981, WCUE Radio, Inc. sold WCUE to Sackett Broadcasting Company; Sackett then installed the Music of Your Life format aimed at older adults. By 1984, WCUE was airing middle of the road music; Jerry Healey was among the on-air personalities heard during these later years.

On October 22, 1986, Sackett Broadcasting donated WCUE to Family Radio of Oakland, California. The daytime power was increased from 1,000 to 2,500 watts in 1988 and then to 5,000 watts in 1990. In 2000, the license transitioned from commercial to non-commercial status. In 2002, Family Radio obtained a main station waiver, allowing WCUE to function solely as a repeater for the Family Radio network.

Current programming
WCUE does not air local programming; all content is transmitted via satellite by the Family Radio network.

References

External links

CUE
Family Radio stations
CUE
Radio stations established in 1949
1949 establishments in Ohio
Cuyahoga Falls, Ohio